First football game may refer to:

 The 1860 Rules derby, the oldest football fixture in the world
 1869 college football season, the first season of intercollegiate football in the United States